David Edward Flint  (born 1938) is an Australian legal academic, known for his leadership of Australians for Constitutional Monarchy and for his tenure as head of the Australian Broadcasting Authority.

Early life and education
David Flint was born in 1938 and grew up in the Sydney suburb of Waverley. His mother was Indonesian. She enjoyed music and dancing, and Flint took her out dancing every week until she died aged 90. That was always disapproved of by his father, a public servant, champion amateur boxer, and member of a puritanical religious organisation.

Flint attended Sydney Boys High School, before studying law, economics and international relations at the Universities of London, Paris, and Sydney, leading to a career in the law and academia. He states that he was "a socialist in his student days".

Career
Admitted as a lawyer in New South Wales and England and Wales, he practised for a number of years, lecturing in several university business and law schools. That included a wide range of subjects including business, tax, antitrust, comparative, constitutional and international law.

He has written widely in various journals, and in the press in English and very occasionally in French, on topics such as the media, international economic law, European Union law, Australia's constitution, Australia's 1999 constitutional referendum and on direct democracy. His views are often sought by the Australian and international media.

In 1975, he joined the Australian Labor Party in indignation over the dismissal of then Prime Minister Gough Whitlam. He was asked to act as head of the University of Technology Sydney Faculty of Business for one year in 1977.

At UTS in the 1980s, he was elected and re-elected president of the union staff association and was a delegate to the NSW Labor Council.

In 1987, he was appointed the UTS Dean of Law in 1987 and reappointed twice, holding office until 1997. He was elected four times by law deans as Convener of the Committee of Australian Law Deans, holding office from 1990 to 1993. In 1990, he was appointed by the federal government as a member of the International Legal Services Council, a position he held for six years. In 1989, after an assessment by a committee including a former chief justice and a professor of international law in three Australian universities, he was awarded a chair in law at UTS. He has held professorial positions in other universities, and is now an emeritus professor of law.

During his term as Dean, he introduced a full-time law degree and a series of joint programmes with other disciplines including computing and science. He also proposed significant changes to Australian university and to Australian legal education, including:
 for the first time in an Australian public university, twelve months teaching through Summer and Winter programmes;
 the introduction of a range of graduate programmes for non-lawyers;
 the first Australian professional doctorate, the SJD;
 the first Australian university programmes in Alternative Dispute Resolution;
 the inclusion of periods of study at foreign universities as part of law and other programmes;
 the incorporation of Practical Legal training into the LL.B – “one-stop” legal education;
 a detailed proposal for the introduction of a US style Doctor Juris;
 strong support for the introduction of AUSTLII, based at UTS in a venture with UNSW, which gives open internet access to Australian statute and case law.

He has been Second Vice-President and National President for Australia of the World Jurist Association, and was also president of the Federation of Australian Branches of the English Speaking Union. He was also a board member and former editor of the Australian Branch of the International Law Association.

Regulator
Flint was appointed head of the Australian Press Council in 1987 in succession to Hal Wootten. All previous chairmen had been former senior judges. As deputy chairman and chairman of the Council's Freedom of the Press Committee, Flint was seen as bringing the Council back from the brink after it divided over how to react to the takeover of Herald and Weekly Times by News Limited, precipitating the resignation of Wootten.

Flint remained in the chairmanship until 1997. His contributions included streamlining the complaints process and enhancing the Council's role in defending freedom of the press, including filing, and appearing in, an amicus curiae brief to the High Court of Australia. He also succeeded in promoting the Council in the media and to the public, all within a tight budget. He requested that the usual honorarium be used for media research and other Council related purposes. From 1992 to 1996, he was Chairman of the Executive Council of the World Association of Press Councils.

During 1998, he was invited by the Coalition Government to chair the Australian Broadcasting Authority, although the only political party he had previously belonged to was the Labor Party, where he had been a branch president. By 2004, having long since abandoned the ALP, he had become a member of the Liberal Party.

In 2004, Flint resigned from the ABA, after a controversy over a letter which he had sent to broadcaster Alan Jones soon after his appointment and well before the lead-up to his heading the ABA's cash for comment inquiry into commercial broadcasting. The letter mentioned an international affairs seminar where Paul Kelly, a leading journalist with The Australian, had stressed the influence of Alan Jones' radio programme. When a controversy later arose about the direct sponsorship of commercial radio presenters, Flint announced that he would ask the ABA board to set up a public inquiry, which board members unanimously agreed to. As chairman of the ABA, Flint was chairman of the inquiry.

In an appearance years later on the ABC television program Enough Rope, prominent Sydney broadcaster John Laws accused Alan Jones of placing pressure on John Howard (prime minister since 1996) to keep Flint as head of the ABA. Laws said he had heard Jones say that he had "instructed" Howard to reappoint Flint in 2001.

Flint insisted that his resignation was "not an admission of guilt", and asserted that he had forgotten the letter, one of a large number which he had written. Furthermore, Flint alleged that, despite a thorough Freedom of Information investigation, hostile sections of the media had inflated the one letter into a "series of fan letters". The television program Media Watch, whose pursuit of the story was recognised by a Walkley Award for investigative journalism, claimed that it had provided an opportunity for Flint to unambiguously deny the existence of more than one letter. According to Media Watch, Flint's reply "did not deny the existence of the correspondence". Flint asserted that Laws was mistaken in his belief that anti-Laws sentiments on his part had led to recent ABA action against Laws. On the contrary, Flint stated in his book Malice in Media Land that he had defended Laws at the ABA, and had opposed the authority's decision to proceed against Laws, believing that the decision was both unjustified and unlawful.

Honours
Flint was awarded World Outstanding Legal Scholar, World Jurists Association, Barcelona, in October 1991. On 12 June 1995, was made a Member of the Order of Australia "in recognition of service to the print media, particularly as Chairman of the Australian Press Council and to international relations".

Monarchist views
Flint is one of Australia's most prominent constitutional monarchists, in opposition to Australian republicanism. His book, The Cane Toad Republic, was used in the 1999 referendum campaign. That was followed in 2003 by Twilight of The Elites, which supported Australia's constitutional arrangements and the role of the Australian Crown. Flint has been National Convenor of Australians for Constitutional Monarchy since 1998, and a board member of the Samuel Griffith Society. He is a patron of the International Monarchist League in Australia, which supports and advances constitutional monarchy.

Views on Australian Same Sex Marriage survey
In 2017, Flint argued against the Australian Marriage Law Postal Survey on the grounds that it was not a valid referendum, and suggested that people should vote no.

Personal life
David Flint has been open about his homosexuality since his early adult years, but never discusses his private life or identifies the long-term partner with whom he has shared a home for over 30 years.

Bibliography

 "Foreign Investment and the New International Economic Order" in Permanent Sovereignty over Natural Resources in International Law (1984)
 The Law of Foreign Investment in Australia (1985)
 Monetary Law Developments in the 1990s in The Right to Development in International Law (1992)
 Business Law of the European Community with Gabriel Moens (1993)
 Australia in Press Law and Practice (1993)
 Lapdog, Watchdog or Junkyard Dog? The Media's Role in Australia's Monarchy/Republic Debate in The Australian Constitutional Monarchy (1994)
 Economic Development, Foreign Investment and the Law, Issues of Private Sector Constitutional and Legislative Safeguards for Foreign Direct Investment: A Comparative Review Utilising Australia and China, with Robert Pritchard and Thomas Chiu, in Involvement, Foreign Investment and the Rule of Law in a New Era (1995)
 Freedom of Speech and Media Regulation in India in Asian Laws Through Australian Eyes (1997)
 Foreign Investment with Thomas Chiu (1998)
 The Australian Constitution in No Case Papers (1998)
 The courts and the media; what reforms are needed and why? in The Courts and the Media (1999)
 The Cane Toad Republic (1999)
 Australian Republicanism, Sovereignty and the States  in Restructuring Australia: Regionalism, republicanism and reform of the nation-state (2004)
 Australian Defamation Law Reform in Defamation and Freedom of the Press (2004)
 The Twilight of the Elites (2003)
 Malice in Media Land (2005)
 A Successful Conservative Party Ready to Rebuild in Liberals and Power (2007)
 Her Majesty at 80 (2006)
 Monarchy or Republic in The Howard Era (2009)
 Give Us Back our Country with Jai Martinkovits (2013)
 Give Us Back our Country 2nd edition, with Jai Martinkovits (2014)
Book reviews

References

External links
 
 David Flint at On Line Opinion

Living people
1938 births
20th-century Australian lawyers
21st-century Australian lawyers
Alumni of the University of London
Australian media personalities
Australian monarchists
Australian political writers
Australian people of Dutch descent
Australian people of Indonesian descent
Australian expatriates in France
Australian expatriates in the United Kingdom
Australian gay writers
Lawyers from Sydney
LGBT lawyers
LGBT media personalities
People educated at Sydney Boys High School
Quadrant (magazine) people
Sydney Law School alumni
University of Paris alumni
Academic staff of the University of Technology Sydney
Writers from Sydney
Gay academics
21st-century LGBT people